The McMullen Hockey Arena is a 1,000-seat ice hockey rink, located on the campus of the United States Naval Academy (USNA) in Annapolis, Maryland and is named for Dr. John J. McMullen, Naval Academy Class of 1940. It is home to the USNA's Navy Midshipmen ice hockey teams, currently competing at the ACHA Division I level in the Eastern Collegiate Hockey Association and the Eastern Collegiate Women's Hockey League.

The arena features a regulation, Olympic-sized ice sheet for ice hockey, seating for around 1,000 spectators, and room for expansion up to 3,000 spectators. In addition, the ice arena meets NCAA Division I standards.

McMullen Hockey Arena was built in 2007 as part of the Thornton D. and Elizabeth S. Hooper Brigade Sports Complex, which also includes the Tose Family Tennis Center, rugby venues, an indoor hitting, chipping and putting facility for the golf team and club members, the pro shop for the golf course, a fitness center, athletic training rooms, locker rooms, office space, meeting rooms, and a restaurant.

References

External links
McMullen Arena
Navy Hockey

United States Naval Academy buildings and structures
Navy Midshipmen sports venues
College ice hockey venues in the United States
Indoor arenas in Maryland
Sports venues in Maryland
Sports venues completed in 2007
Indoor ice hockey venues in Maryland
2007 establishments in Maryland